Acidovorax oryzae is a bacterium from the Comamonadaceae family which is closely related to Acidovorax citrulli. Acidovorax oryzae was reclassificated from the former name Acidovorax avenae subsp. avenae. It has been shown that Acidovorax oryzae is serious pathogen fore rice (Oryza sativa).

Etymology
A. oryzae comes from the Latin genus "oryzae" which means rice. A.oryzae is causal agent of bacterial brown stripe on rice.

References

Comamonadaceae
Bacteria described in 2009